This article provides a list of widget toolkits (also known as GUI frameworks), used to construct the graphical user interface (GUI) of programs, organized by their relationships with various operating systems.

Low-level widget toolkits

Integrated in the operating system
 macOS uses Cocoa. Mac OS 9 and macOS used to use Carbon for 32-bit applications.
 The Windows API used in Microsoft Windows. Microsoft had the graphics functions integrated in the kernel until 2006
 The Haiku operating system uses an extended and modernised version of the Be API that was used by its spiritual predecessor BeOS. Haiku Inc. is expected to drop binary and source compatibility with the BeOS at some point in the future, which will result in its own Haiku API.

As a separate layer on top of the operating system
 The X Window System contains primitive building blocks, called Xt or "Intrinsics", but they are mostly only used by older toolkits such as: OLIT, Motif and Xaw. Most contemporary toolkits, such as GTK or Qt, bypass them and use Xlib or XCB directly.
 The Amiga OS Intuition was formerly present in the Amiga Kickstart ROM and integrated itself with a medium-high level widget library which invoked the Workbench Amiga native GUI. Since Amiga OS 2.0, Intuition.library became disk based and object oriented. Also Workbench.library and Icon.library became disk based, and could be replaced with similar third-party solutions.
 Since 2005, Microsoft has taken the graphics system out of Windows' kernel.

High-level widget toolkits

OS dependent

On Amiga
 BOOPSI (Basic Object Oriented Programming System for Intuition) was introduced with OS 2.0 and enhanced Intuition with a system of classes in which every class represents a single widget or describes an interface event. This led to an evolution in which third-party developers each realised their own personal systems of classes.
 MUI: object-oriented GUI toolkit and the official toolkit for MorphOS.
 ReAction: object-oriented GUI toolkit and the official toolkit for AmigaOS.
 Zune (GUI toolkit) is an open source clone of MUI and the official toolkit for AROS.

On macOS
 Cocoa - used in macOS (see also Aqua). As a result of macOS' OPENSTEP lineage, Cocoa also supports Windows, although it is not publicly advertised as such. It is generally unavailable for use by third-party developers. An outdated and feature-limited open-source subset of Cocoa exists within the WebKit project, however; it is used to render Aqua natively in Safari (web browser) for Windows. Apple's iTunes, which supports both GDI and WPF, includes a mostly complete binary version of the framework as "Apple Application Support".
 Carbon - the deprecated framework used in macOS to port “classic” Mac applications and software to the macOS.
 MacApp, the framework for the Classic Mac OS by Apple.
 PowerPlant, the framework for the Classic Mac OS by Metrowerks.

On Microsoft Windows
 The Microsoft Foundation Classes (MFC), a C++ wrapper around the Windows API.
 The Windows Template Library (WTL), a template-based extension to ATL and a replacement of MFC
 The Object Windows Library (OWL), Borland's alternative to MFC.
 The Visual Component Library (VCL) is Embarcadero's toolkit used in C++Builder and Delphi. It wraps the native Windows controls, providing object-oriented classes and visual design, although also allowing access to the underlying handles and other WinAPI details if required. It was originally implemented as a successor to OWL, skipping the OWL/MFC style of UI creation, which by the mid-nineties was a dated design model.
 Windows Forms (WinForms) is Microsoft's .NET set of classes that handle GUI controls. In the cross-platform Mono implementation, it is an independent toolkit, implemented entirely in managed code (not wrapping the Windows API, which doesn't exist on other platforms). WinForms' design closely mimics that of the VCL.
 The Windows Presentation Foundation (WPF) is the graphical subsystem of the .NET Framework 3.0. User interfaces can be created in WPF using any of the CLR languages (e.g. C#) or with the XML-based language XAML. Microsoft Expression Blend is a visual GUI builder for WPF.
 The Windows UI Library (WinUI) is the graphical subsystem of universal apps. User interfaces can be created in WinUI using C++ or any of the .NET languages (e.g., C#) or with the XML-based language XAML. Microsoft Expression Blend is a visual GUI builder that supports WinUI.

On Unix, under the X Window System
Note that the X Window System was originally primarily for Unix-like operating systems, but it now runs on Microsoft Windows as well using, for example, Cygwin, so some or all of these toolkits can also be used under Windows.
 Motif used in the Common Desktop Environment.
LessTif, an open source (LGPL) version of Motif.
 MoOLIT, a bridge between the look-and-feel of OPEN LOOK and Motif
 OLIT, an Xt-based OPEN LOOK intrinsics toolkit
 Xaw, the Project Athena widget set for the X Window System.
 XView, a SunView compatible OPEN LOOK toolkit

Cross-platform

Based on C (including bindings to other languages)
 Elementary, open source (LGPL), a part of the Enlightenment Foundation Libraries, a fast, stable, and scalable library that can be used to create both rich and fast applications that can be used on anything from every day desktop computers to small PDA's and set-top boxes.
 GTK, open source (LGPL), primarily for the X Window System, ported to and emulated under other platforms; used in the GNOME, Rox, LXDE and Xfce desktop environments. The Windows port has support for native widgets.
 IUP, open source (MIT), a minimalist GUI toolkit in ANSI C for Windows, UNIX and Linux.
 Tk, open source (BSD-style), a widget set accessed from Tcl and other high-level script languages (interfaced in Python as Tkinter).
 XForms, the Forms Library for X
 XVT, Extensible Virtual Toolkit

Based on C++ (including bindings to other languages)
 CEGUI, open source (MIT License), cross-platform widget toolkit designed for game development, but also usable for applications and tool development. Supports multiple renderers and optional libraries.
 FLTK, open source (LGPL), cross-platform toolkit designed to be small and fast.
 FOX toolkit, open source (LGPL), cross-platform toolkit.
 GLUI, a very small toolkit written with the GLUT library.
 gtkmm, C++ interface for GTK
 Juce provides GUI and widget set with the same look and feel in Microsoft Windows, X Window Systems, macOS and Android. Rendering can be based on OpenGL.
 Nana C++, open source (Boost license), a cross-platform toolkit designed to enable modern C++ GUI programming
 Qt, proprietary and open source (GPL, LGPL) available under Unix and Linux (with X11 or Wayland), Windows (Desktop, CE and Phone 8), macOS, iOS, Android, BlackBerry 10 and embedded Linux; used in the KDE, Trinity, LXQt, and Lumina desktop environment, it's also used in Ubuntu's Unity shell.
 Rogue Wave Views (formerly ILOG Views) provides GUI and graphic library for Windows and the main X11 platforms.
 TnFOX, open source (LGPL), a portability toolkit.
 Ultimate++ is a free Win32/X11 application framework bundled with an IDE (BSD license)
 The Visual Component Framework (VCF) is an open source (BSD license) C++ framework project.
 wxWidgets (formerly wxWindows), open source (relaxed LGPL), abstracts toolkits across several platforms for C++, Python, Perl, Ruby and Haskell.
 Zinc Application Framework, cross-platform widget toolkit.

Based on Python
 Tkinter, open source (BSD) is a Python binding to the Tk GUI toolkit. Tkinter is included with standard GNU/Linux, Microsoft Windows and macOS installs of Python.
 Kivy, open source (MIT) is a modern library for rapid development of applications that make use of innovative user interfaces, such as multi-touch apps. Fully written in Python with additional speed ups in Cython.
 PySide, open source (LGPL) is a Python binding of the cross-platform GUI toolkit Qt developed by The Qt Company, as part of the Qt for Python project.
 PyQt, open source (GPL and commercial) is another Python binding of the cross-platform GUI toolkit Qt developed by Riverbank Computing.
 PyGTK, open source (LGPL) is a set of Python wrappers for the GTK graphical user interface library.
 wxPython, open source (wxWindows License) is a wrapper for the cross-platform GUI API wxWidgets for the Python programming language.
 Pyjs, open source (Apache License 2.0) is a rich web application framework for developing client-side web and desktop applications, it is a port of Google Web Toolkit (GWT) from Java.

Based on OpenGL
 Clutter (LGPL) (in C) is an open source software library for creating fast, visually rich and animated graphical user interfaces.

Based on Flash
 Adobe Flash allows creating widgets running in most web browsers and in several mobile phones.
 Adobe Flex provides high-level widgets for building web user interfaces. Flash widgets can be used in Flex.
 Flash and Flex widgets will run without a web browser in the Adobe AIR runtime environment.

Based on Go
 Fyne, open source (BSD) is inspired by the principles of Material Design to create applications that look and behave consistently across Windows, macOS, Linux, BSD, Android and iOS.

Based on XML
 GladeXML with GTK
 XAML with Silverlight or Moonlight
 XUL

Based on JavaScript

General
 jQuery UI
 MooTools
 Qooxdoo Could be understood as Qt for the Web
 Script.aculo.us

RIAs
 Adobe AIR
 Dojo Toolkit
 Sencha (formerly Ext JS)
 Telerik Kendo UI
 Webix
 WinJS
 React

Full-stack framework
 Echo3
 SproutCore
 Telerik UI for ASP/PHP/JSP/Silverlight
 Vaadin - Java
 ZK - A Java Web framework for building rich Ajax and mobile applications

Resource-based
 Google Web Toolkit (GWT)
 Pyjs
 FBML Facebook Markup Language

No longer developed
 YUI (Yahoo! User Interface Library)

Based on SVG
 Raphaël is a JavaScript toolkit for SVG interfaces and animations

Based on C#
 Gtk#, C# wrappers around the underlying GTK and GNOME libraries, written in C and available on Linux, MacOS and Windows.
 QtSharp, C# wrappers around the Qt widget toolkit, which is itself based-on the C++ language.
 Windows Forms. There is an original Microsoft's implementation that is a wrapper around the Windows API and runs on windows, and Mono's alternative implementation that is cross platform.

Based on Java
 The Abstract Window Toolkit (AWT) is Sun Microsystems' original widget toolkit for Java applications. It typically uses another toolkit on each platform on which it runs.
 Swing is a richer widget toolkit supported since J2SE 1.2 as a replacement for AWT widgets. Swing is a lightweight toolkit, meaning it does not rely on native widgets.
 Apache Pivot is an open-source platform for building rich web applications in Java or any JVM-compatible language, and relies on the WTK widget toolkit.
 JavaFX and FXML.
 The Standard Widget Toolkit (SWT) is a native widget toolkit for Java that was developed as part of the Eclipse project. SWT uses a standard toolkit for the running platform (such as the Windows API, OS X Cocoa, or GTK) underneath.
 Codename One originally designed as a cross platform mobile toolkit it later expanded to support desktop applications both through JavaSE and via a JavaScript pipeline through browsers
 java-gnome provides bindings to the GTK toolkit and other libraries of the GNOME desktop environment
 Qt Jambi, the official Java binding to Qt from Trolltech. The commercial support and development has stopped

Based on Object Pascal
FireMonkey or FMX is a cross-platform widget and graphics library distributed with Delphi and C++Builder since version XE2 in 2011. It has bindings for C++ through C++Builder, and supports Windows, macOS, iOS, Android, and most recently Linux. FireMonkey supports both platform-native widgets, such as a native edit control, as well as custom widgets that are styled to look native on the target operating system. Its graphics are GPU-accelerated and it supports styling, and mixing its own implementation controls with native system controls, which lets apps use native behaviour where it's important (for example, for IME text input.)
IP Pascal uses a graphics library built on top of standard language constructs. Also unusual for being a procedural toolkit that is cross-platform (no callbacks or other tricks), and is completely upward compatible with standard serial input and output paradigms. Completely standard programs with serial output can be run and extended with graphical constructs.
 Lazarus LCL (for Pascal, Object Pascal and Delphi via Free Pascal compiler), a class library wrapping GTK+ 1.2, Gtk+ 2.x and the Windows API (Carbon, Windows CE and Qt4 support are all in development).
 fpGUI is created with the Free Pascal compiler. It doesn't rely on any large 3rdParty libraries and currently runs on Linux, Windows, Windows CE, and Mac (via X11). A Carbon (OS X) port is underway.
 CLX (Component Library for Cross-platform) was used with Borland's (now Embarcadero's) Delphi, C++ Builder, and Kylix, for producing cross-platform applications between Windows and Linux. It was based on Qt, wrapped in such a way that its programming interface was similar to that of the VCL toolkit. It is no longer maintained and distributed, and has been replaced with FireMonkey, a newer toolkit also supporting more platforms, since 2011.

Based on Objective-C
 GNUstep
 Cocoa

Based on Dart
 Flutter (software) is an open-source and cross platform framework created by Google.

Based on Swift
 Cocoa Touch is a framework created by Apple to build applications for iOS, iPadOS and tvOS.

Based on Ruby
 Shoes (GUI toolkit) is a cross platform framework for graphical user interface development.

Not yet categorised 
 WINGs
 LiveCode
 Wt
 Immediate Mode GUI

Comparison of widget toolkits

See also
 List of platform-independent GUI libraries

References

External links
 The GUI Toolkit, Framework Page, comparing some of the modern GUIs out there.
 Survey of Widget sets (for the X Window System) (Edward Falk)
 GUI Toolkits for The X Window System (Leslie Polzer, freshmeat.net, 27 July 2003)
 Overview of Microsoft Windows GUI libraries

Widget toolkits